Vanessa Filipa Santos Rodrigues (born 4 September 1993), known as Filipa Rodrigues or Pipa, is a Portuguese professional footballer who plays as a defender for the Portugal women's national team.

Honours
Atlético Ouriense
 Campeonato Nacional Feminino: 2013–14
Benfica
 Campeonato Nacional II Divisão Feminino: 2018–19
 Taça de Portugal: 2018–19

References

External links
 
 

1993 births
Living people
People from Mangualde
Portuguese women's footballers
Portugal women's international footballers
Women's association football defenders
Atlético Ouriense players
S.L. Benfica (women) footballers
Campeonato Nacional de Futebol Feminino players
Sportspeople from Viseu District